The 2019 Piedmontese regional election took place on 26 May 2019, the same day as the European Parliament election in Italy. The election was for all 50 members of the Regional Council of Piedmont, as well as for the President of the Region, who is also a member of the Council.

Electoral system
Regional elections in Piedmont were ruled by the "Tatarella law" (approved in 1995), which provided for a mixed electoral system: four fifths of the regional councilors were elected in provincial constituencies by proportional representation, using the largest remainder method with a droop quota and open lists, while the residual votes and the unassigned seats were grouped into a "single regional constituency", where the whole ratios and the highest remainders were divided with the Hare method among the provincial party lists; one fifth of the council seats instead was reserved for regional lists and assigned with a majoritarian system: the leader of the regional list that scored the highest number of votes was elected to the presidency of the Region while the other candidates were elected regional councilors.

A threshold of 3% had been established for the provincial lists, which, however, could still have entered the regional council if the regional list to which they were connected had scored at least 5% of valid votes.

The panachage was also allowed: the voter can indicate a candidate for the presidency but prefer a provincial list connected to another candidate.

Background
Sergio Chiamparino is the outgoing President of Piedmont for the Democratic Party, and although he initially stated in June to not run for a second term, he finally declared he will run in the next regional election. He supported the joint candidacy of Turin, Milan and Cortina d'Ampezzo for the 2026 Winter Olympics before Chiara Appendino, mayor of Turin for the Five Star Movement, decided to withdraw from the bidding process. He supported the Turin–Lyon high-speed railway and criticized the Conte Cabinet for its opposition, led mainly by the Five Star Movement. Finally, he advocated a referendum about the Turin-Lyon on the same day as the regional election and asked to the Minister of the Interior Matteo Salvini to allow it, but both the Prime Minister Giuseppe Conte and the Minister Salvini rejected the idea.

The centre-right had some troubles to reach an agreement for a unitary candidate. Alberto Cirio, current MEP, was the candidate proposed by Forza Italia, but the League opposed his candidacy, proposing instead the entrepreneur Paolo Damilano. After the regional election in Basilicata, the center-right agreed to the candidacy of Cirio. Alberto Cirio was the former deputy mayor for Alba and former regional assessor for Piedmont, he was elected for the European election of 2014 in the North-West Italy constituency with 35.388 votes and he backed the Turin–Lyon high-speed railway. In June 2018, along with 50 regional councillors, he was committed to stand trial on charges of misappropriating €20,000 of public funds, during 2008 and 2010, under the presidency of Mercedes Bresso. However, next February the Turin public prosecutor's office filed a motion to dismiss.

The candidate for the presidency of Piedmont for the Five Star Movement was voted on the party website, and with 1,540 votes Giorgio Bertola, outgoing regional councillor for Piedmont, won the primary election. He strongly opposed the Turin-Lyon and the referendum proposed by Chiamparino.

Parties and candidates

Debates
There were seven presidential debates held across Piedmont (and, in one case, in Veneto) during the electoral campaign.

Opinion polls

Results

See also
2019 Italian regional elections

References

Elections in Piedmont
2019 elections in Italy
May 2019 events in Italy